On 4 September 2015, the Houthis launched an OTR-21 Tochka ballistic missile against a military base in Safer, an area in Marib Governorate. The base was being used by military forces of the Saudi-led coalition. The missile hit an ammunition dump, creating a huge explosion which inflicted numerous casualties among coalition troops. 52 Emirati, Ten Saudi and five Bahraini soldiers were killed in the attack. In addition, dozens of pro-Hadi Yemeni troops were also killed in the strike.

Aftermath
In retaliation UAEAF F16F Block 60 conducted several airstrikes on Ma'rib, Sanaa, and Sa'dah in retaliation for the attack in which was described "the heaviest airstrikes Sanaa endured". The UAEAF also bombed the position from which the missile is believed to have been fired.

The United Arab Emirates declared a three-day period of mourning with the UAE flag flying at half-mast in honor of the soldiers killed in Yemen, the deadliest episode in UAE army history. The UAE leaders, including sheikh Mohammed bin Zayed Al Nahyan, sheikh Mohammed bin Rashid Al Maktoum, and the sheikhs of the Federal Supreme Council, visited the family homes of each of the fallen soldiers and offered their condolences.

United States Secretary of State John Kerry offered his condolences to the UAE Foreign Minister Abdullah bin Zayed Al Nahyan on the death of the Emirati soldiers.

References

2015 in Yemen
Conflicts in 2015
Military operations involving Yemen
September 2015 events in Asia
Yemeni Civil War (2014–present)
United Arab Emirates–Yemen relations
Marib Governorate